The Final Sessions is an album by jazz pianist Elmo Hope which compiles sessions recorded in 1966, originally released as Last Sessions Volume One and Last Sessions Volume Two on the Inner City label in 1977.

Reception

The Allmusic review by Scott Yanow stated "Elmo Hope is in surprisingly joyous form throughout the set, sounding both original and accessible to bebop fans. Highly recommended".

Track listing
All compositions by Elmo Hope except as indicated

Disc One:
 "I Love You" (Cole Porter) – 10:50  
 "A Night in Tunisia" (Dizzy Gillespie, Frank Paparelli) – 10:16  
 "Stellations" – 4:22  
 "Pam" – 2:47  
 "Elmo's Blues" – 10:42  
 "Somebody Loves Me" (Buddy DeSylva, George Gershwin, Ballard MacDonald) – 8:42  
 "Low Tide" – 4:57  
 "Low Tide" [alternate take] – 6:32  
Disc Two:
 "Roll On" – 2:56  
 "Roll On" [alternate take] – 5:52  
 "Vi-Ann" – 6:37  
 "Vi-Ann" [alternate take] – 5:40  
 "Toothsome Threesome" – 8:52  
 "Grammy" – 8:26  
 "A Kiss for My Love" – 8:04  
 "Something for Kenny" – 6:40  
 "Punch That" – 9:37

Personnel 
Elmo Hope – piano
John Ore – bass
Clifford Jarvis (Disc One, tracks 6–8 and Disc Two), Philly Joe Jones (Disc One, tracks 1–5) – drums

References 

1996 albums
Evidence Music albums
Inner City Records albums
Elmo Hope albums